The National Committee of the Chinese Educational, Scientific, Cultural, Medical and Sports Workers’ Union is a national industrial union of the All-China Federation of Trade Unions in the People's Republic of China.

External links
basic info from the ACFTU

National industrial unions (China)
Education trade unions
Healthcare trade unions
Sports trade unions
Medical and health organizations based in China